Myripristis tiki, the tiki squirrelfish, is a species of soldierfish belonging to the genus Myripristis. It can be found in the Pacific Ocean in the Cook Islands, Tonga, Pitcairn, the Cook Islands and Easter Island.

References

tiki
Fish of the Pacific Ocean
Taxa named by David Wayne Greenfield